Methylaniline may refer to:

 N-Methylaniline
 Toluidines
 2-Methylaniline (o-toluidine)
 3-Methylaniline (m-toluidine)
 4-Methylaniline (p-toluidine)